The Philadelphia Experiment is a 2012 science fiction TV movie. It is directed by Paul Ziller and stars Michael Paré, Malcolm McDowell, Nicholas Lea, and Emilie Ullerup and based on the urban legend of the Philadelphia Experiment.

Plot
In 1943, the US Navy ship USS Eldridge disappears, due to the Philadelphia Experiment.  In the present day (2012), researchers try to re-create the experiment, which has the unintended consequence of making the Eldridge reappear, apparently having traveled through time.  The sole survivor of the original experiment is aboard, and meets up with his now-adult granddaughter.  The Eldridge continues to drift through time and space, trapping others aboard it.  The research company attempts to cover-up the incident by trying to kill everyone involved.  A struggle ensues as others try to protect the survivors, and return them their original time and place.

Other portrayals
Actor Michael Paré, featured 28 years earlier in the 1984 film of the same name, had the role of henchman Hagan in this remake.

See also
Philadelphia Experiment

References

External links
 

2012 television films
Films about conspiracy theories
Films about time travel
Films set in 1943
Films set in 2012
Films directed by Paul Ziller
Canadian action thriller films
Canadian fantasy films
Canadian science fiction action films
Canadian science fiction television films
Canadian science fiction thriller films
Canadian thriller television films
English-language Canadian films
CineTel Films films
Syfy original films
2012 science fiction action films
2010s English-language films
2010s Canadian films
2010s American films